Beautiful But Dangerous (also released as La donna più bella del mondo/ The World's Most Beautiful Woman) is a 1956 French-Italian comedy drama romance film directed by Robert Z. Leonard. The picture is a biopic about Italian opera soprano Lina Cavalieri. The film was a co-production between Italy (where it was released as La donna più bella del mondo) and France (where is known with the title La belle des belles). For this film Gina Lollobrigida was awarded a David di Donatello for Best Actress.

Plot

Lina (Gina Lollobrigida) is an orphan, brought up by her adopted mother who trains her for music. Her mother becomes sick due to a heart attack on the stage, and Lina goes to the stage in place of her mother. A group teases her, by connecting her to her mother's name and will not allow her to perform. From the balcony, the prince of Russia, Sergio (Vittorio Gassman) comes down and makes the teaser group leave the theater and asks Lina to perform. It was a very good performance, but at the end, she finds out that her mother had another attack, and has been sent to the long distance hospital. By the night she wants to go, but there is no way to. Sergio offers her lift to the hospital, and on the way, they get to know each other. The prince does not tell Lina his real identity but will say only that he came there for horse competition in the local club, and he stays regularly in Paris and he is from Russia. After reaching the hospital, she leaves her handbag in the coach. Sergio puts money and his golden ring in the bag and gives it to Lina. She hurries into the hospital and discovers her mother has died.

	Next, she enters the horse riding club and finds out Sergio stood first in the competition. She also discovers that he is the prince. She returns the money and the ring back to him, but he says that he will take all the things in Paris. Let her come to Paris, and becoming a very famous singer, and he will find her out!

	With the dream she goes back to her music school in Rome and asks for the best teacher, she is ready to pay anything. They recommend Doria (Robert Alda) who trains her and brings her to Paris. Doria is in love with Lina, but Lina is in love with Sergio. She refuses Doria and leaves him. She struggles to get a chance and finally settles down to some extent with Carmela (Anne Vernon). One of the singers is jealous of her and finally is fired from the opera for her. They fight, and after seeing this one of the members gets the idea to make a live show of shored fighting in between the two ladies to earn money. Lina owns the competition, and there a famous music director Silvani (Mario Del Monaco) meets her and invites her to the theater. From that stage, Lina’s name becomes famous as ‘the knight’.

	One day Doria comes and expresses his love for her again, but she refuses. Before a stage show one day, she notices in the balcony the prince is there. She is thrilled. At the end of the show, she expects a bouquet of flower from the prince, but nothing is there. She is disappointed. Silvani comes and invites both the friends for a party at his house. As they agree to go, suddenly the representative of the Prince comes and sends the message that the prince has arranged a party in the honour of Lina. She accepts the offer and finally meets the prince.

	In an intimate situation, the Prince is trying to say something to Lina, but she is not in the mood to listen. Suddenly the friends of the prince knock on the door, and overhearing the words from them, Lina misunderstands the Prince and thinks that he is going to marry somebody else in Russia. She leaves him, and leaves Paris for an unknown place.

	In a village side nearby Paris, Lina, Carmela stay together and Silvani comes to teach her extensive lesions on opera music. One day, before leaving to Paris, Silvani says that he loves Lina, and she need not to answer him right then. If at all, any time in life she feels for him, he is there for her. Silvani, in Paris meets an opera whose music director was Doria, where they will arrange for Lina to sing. Again her name will spread like anything; Doria becomes jealous of Silvani.

	In between the show, one day Sergio comes and meets Lina in the dressing room. He refused his uncle’s marriage proposal for him and came to spend life with Lina. Lina refuses him, because of her misconception of the prince and in front of Silvani says that she will marry him after the show. Doria appoints somebody to kill Silvani during the scene of a firing squad. 
Silvani dies, Lina thinks Sergio killed him, and Doria understands that she doesn't suspect him. So now for him, the road is clear, he will take her to a stage show in a different part of the world. Finally, an invitation comes from the Tsar of Russia.

	On the way to Russia, due to snowfall, the train halts for two hours, and there Sergio meets her again. But this time she accuses him of the murder of Silvani. Extremely insulted, Sergio leaves.

	During the meeting with the Tsar and his wife, Lina sees Sergio, and she says that she wants to sing the new opera Tusca, the last performance with Silvani. Doria objects, but the Quinn shows her interest for that.

	During the performance, Doria is over tensed, because last time he arranged the murder of Silvani; Lina is doing extremely well because she is emotionally charged and the Prince Sergio feels disgusted because he thinks that Lina is creating pressure on him unnecessarily.  Finally at the time of shooting, suddenly Doria will scream and shout ‘don’t shoot, don’t shoot’. He admits to Lina that it was he, who plotted the murder of Silvani out of jealousy.

	Finally, Lina goes back to the Prince and both of them walk away.

Cast 

 Gina Lollobrigida: Lina Cavalieri
 Vittorio Gassman: Sergio
 Robert Alda: Doria
 Anne Vernon: Carmela
 Tamara Lees: Manolita
 Gino Sinimberghi: Silvani
 Nanda Primavera: Olimpia
 Nico Pepe: Louis
 Enzo Biliotti: Perret
 Valeria Fabrizi: Silvana
 Marco Tulli: Judge at the duel
 Annie Cordy

Release
In the US, the film was acquired by Howard Hughes for distribution by 20th Century Fox. The film was due for release in Boston in early 1957 but was denied a Production Code seal until a love scene was cut.

References

External links
 

1955 films
Italian romantic comedy-drama films
Italian biographical drama films
Biographical films about singers
Films about opera
Films set in the 1900s
Films set in Rome
Films set in Paris
Films shot in Rome
Films shot in Paris
Films set in Italy
Films shot in Italy
Films directed by Robert Z. Leonard
1950s romantic comedy-drama films
1950s biographical drama films
Musical films based on actual events
1955 comedy-drama films
Films scored by Renzo Rossellini
Cultural depictions of Italian women
1950s Italian films